Kress High School is a public high school located in Kress, Texas (USA) and classified as a 1A school by the UIL.  It is part of the Kress Independent School District located in southern Swisher County.  In 2013, the school was rated "Met Standard" by the Texas Education Agency.

Athletics
The Kress Kangaroos compete in the following sports:

6-Man Football, 
Baseball
Basketball
Golf
Tennis
Track

References

External links
Kress ISD
List of Six-man football stadiums in Texas

Schools in Swisher County, Texas
Public high schools in Texas
Public middle schools in Texas